The McDonnell F3H Demon is a subsonic swept-wing United States Navy carrier-based jet fighter aircraft. The successor to the F2H Banshee, the Demon was originally designed to use the Westinghouse J40 engine, but had to be redesigned to accept the Allison J71 after the J40 suffered severe problems and was ultimately abandoned. Though it lacked sufficient power for supersonic performance and sufficient endurance for its intended general-purpose role, it complemented day fighters such as the Vought F8U Crusader and Grumman F11F Tiger as an all-weather, missile-armed interceptor until 1964.

The Demon was withdrawn before it could serve in the Vietnam War; both it and the Crusader were replaced on Forrestal-class and similar supercarriers by the McDonnell Douglas F-4 Phantom II. McDonnell's Phantom, which was equally capable against ground, fighter, and bomber targets, bears a strong family resemblance, as it was conceived as an advanced development of the Demon. The supersonic United States Air Force F-101 Voodoo was similar in layout, but was derived from the earlier XF-88 Voodoo, which also influenced the Demon's layout.

Development

Although the existence of the Mikoyan-Gurevich MiG-15 aircraft program was unknown to U.S. intelligence at the time, the U.S. Navy anticipated the appearance of high-performance Soviet jet fighters, and issued requirements for a high-performance swept wing naval fighter on 21 May 1948. Development work began in 1949, using a swept wing from the start rather than adapting a straight-winged design as was done with the Grumman F9F Panther. The original design work was based at its predecessor, the F2H Banshee. The Demon emerged as an all-new design, and to meet Navy requirements, McDonnell agreed to use the Westinghouse J40 engine which was then under development. The J40 was being promoted by the Navy for its next generation of aircraft, and was to have thrust of over 11,000 lbf (49 kN)—three times that of the engines in the F2H Banshee. The Demon was the first swept-wing design produced by McDonnell and among the first U.S. aircraft to have missile armament.

The unexpected combat debut of the MiG-15 during the Korean War made the Demon a top priority for the Navy, as the MiG far outclassed the Panther and Banshee; the only U.S. fighter then in service that could equal the MiG was the F-86A Sabre, which was only operated by the U.S. Air Force. Production of the F3H-1N was hastily ordered even before the first flight of the XF3H-1 prototype on 7 August 1951 by test pilot Robert Edholm. The first test flights of the operational design did not occur until January 1953, by which time the Korean War was winding down.

The F3H Demon was originally designed around Navy's ambitious new Westinghouse J40 which was to offer enough power to use just one engine in a number of new aircraft designs. But the engine would ultimately fail to produce the promised thrust or run reliably. The engine was a major disappointment, producing only half of the expected power. Worse, it was temperamental and unreliable. Of 35 F3H-1N aircraft flown with the J40 engine, eight were involved in major accidents. The first production Demons were grounded after the loss of six aircraft and four pilots. Time magazine called the Navy's grounding of all Westinghouse-powered F3H-1 Demons a "fiasco", with 21 unflyable planes that could be used only for Navy ground training at a loss of $200 million. The proposed F3H-1P reconnaissance version was never built. The J40 program was terminated sometime in 1955.

All the aircraft it was to power were either canceled or redesigned to use other engines, notably the J57 and the J71. The F4D Skyray had been designed to accept larger engines in case the J40 did not work out, and was eventually powered by the Pratt & Whitney J57. But no other engine could simply be fitted into the old Demons, as both the wings and fuselage would have to be redesigned and enlarged. The best alternative turned out to be the Allison J71 engine which was also used in the Douglas B-66 Destroyer. Subsequent F3Hs with this powerplant were designated the F3H-2N. In service, the J71 proved problematic, providing insufficient power for an aircraft of the Demon's size. The engine also suffered from frequent flameouts and compressor stalls. The first J71-powered Demon flew in October 1954. Another significant problem was the reliability of the ejection seats: initial versions were found to be unreliable and were eventually replaced with Martin-Baker ejection seats that were becoming the standard Navy seat of choice due to their higher performance at low altitude and better reliability.

Despite the problems, the Navy ordered 239 F3H-2s, and the first were deployed in March 1956. 519 Demons were built up to the end of production in November 1959. It was not the Navy's first all-weather interceptor with radar (the AN/APG-51 air interception set was used first on the F2H-4 Banshee). The F3H-2 Demon had the AN/APG-51A, later upgraded to the 51-B version with a tunable magnetron then on to 51-C with better counter-measures in the receiver.

The F3H-2N's standard armament was four 20 mm (.79 in) Colt Mk 12 cannons. In later years, the upper two cannons were often omitted to save weight. Later models, redesignated F3H-2M, were equipped to fire the Raytheon AAM-N-2 Sparrow and later the Sidewinder air-to-air missiles. Deployed aircraft carried both types of missiles, the Sparrow on the inboard rails and the Sidewinder outboard. Cannons were not used in carrier air defense applications, but they were installed and armed when situations (such as the Cuban Missile Crisis) dictated, and where the aircraft might be deployed against surface targets.

A reconnaissance version, the F3H-2P, was proposed, but never built. It remained the Navy's front-line fighter until 1962, when it was succeeded by the F-4 Phantom II (which was a development of a proposed "Super Demon", a larger and much heavier version of the F3H). Developed during the Korean War to counter the MiG-15, it did not claim any aerial victories with missiles or dogfights, although it flew over Lebanon and Quemoy in 1958.

In 1962, the F3H was redesignated F-3. The F3H-2N became the F-3C, the F3H-2M became MF-3B, and the F3H-2 changed to F-3B.

The last Demon-equipped squadron, VF-161 'Chargers', traded their F-3s for F-4 Phantom IIs in September 1964.

Due to excellent visibility from the cockpit, the Demon earned the nickname "The Chair". Demon pilots were known colloquially as "Demon Drivers" and those who worked on the aircraft were known as "Demon Doctors". The unfavorable power-to-weight ratio gave rise to the less flattering nickname "lead sled", sometimes shortened to "sled".

Variants

XF3H-1
 Prototype single-seat clear-weather interceptor fighter. Two built.
F3H-1N
 Initial production version.
F3H-1P
 Proposed reconnaissance version of F3H-1. Never built.
F3H-2N
Redesignated F-3C in 1962.
F3H-2M
 Derivative of F3H-2N armed with four AIM-7 Sparrow air-to-air missiles. 80 built. Redesignated MF-3B in 1962.
F3H-2
 Single-seat strike fighter version, retaining Sidewinder and Sparrow capability of the −2M/N and adding payload of 6,000 lb (2,730 kg) bombs or rockets. 239 built. Redesignated F-3B in 1962.
F3H-2P
 Proposed photo-reconnaissance version of −2. Unbuilt.
F3H-3
 Proposed version with the General Electric J73 engine. Unbuilt.

Operators

 United States Navy

Aircraft on display

F3H-2M
BuNo 137078 - National Museum Naval Aviation at Naval Air Station Pensacola, Florida.

F3H-2N
BuNo 133566 - USS Intrepid Museum in New York City, New York.
BuNo 145221 - Pima Air & Space Museum, adjacent to Davis-Monthan AFB in Tucson, Arizona.

Specifications (F3H-2)

See also

References

Notes

Bibliography

Angelucci, Enzo and Peter M. Bowers. The American Fighter. Sparkford, Somerset, UK: Haynes Publishing Group, 1987. .
Dorr, Robert F. "McDonnell F3H Demon". Aeroplane, Volume 36, No. 3, March 2008, pp. 58–73. London: IBC.
Elward, Brad A. and Peter Davies. US Navy F-4 Phantom II MiG Killers 1965–70, Part 1 (Osprey Combat Aircraft). London: Osprey Publishing, 2001. .
 .
Gunston, Bill. Fighters of the Fifties. Cambridge, UK: Patrick Stephens Limited, 1981. .
"Naval Aircraft: Demon". Naval Aviation News, March 1974, pp. 22–23.
Spick, Mike. "A Demon Possessed". Air Enthusiast, Forty-three, 1991, pp. 40–49. Stamford, UK: Key Publishing. ISSN 0143-5450.

External links

F3H Demon Index
Modeling Madness Demon History
Demon Drivers
Bob Jellison's F3H Demon
Global Security

Carrier-based aircraft
F3H Demon
McDonnell F03H Demon
Low-wing aircraft
Single-engined jet aircraft
Aircraft first flown in 1951
Second-generation jet fighters